This is a list of gliders/sailplanes of the world, (this reference lists all gliders with references, where available) 
Note: Any aircraft can glide for a short time, but gliders are designed to glide for longer.

N

N.V. Vliegtuigbouw 
 N.V. Vliegtuigbouw V-20
 N.V. Vliegtuigbouw 013 Sagitta
 N.V. Vliegtuigbouw Deventer

Naleszkiewicz-Nowotny
(Franciszek Kotowski & Adam Nowotny)
 Naleszkiewicz-Nowotny NN 1
 Naleszkiewicz-Nowotny NN 2
 Naleszkiewicz-Nowotny NN 2bis
 Naleszkiewicz JN 1
 Nowotny ITS-IV b

NASA
 NASA Hyper III

NAF 
(Naval Aircraft Factory)
 Naval Aircraft Factory LRN
 Naval Aircraft Factory LR2N

Nebeský-Nebeský-Najman
(Jaroslav Nebeský & Jan Nebeský & J. Najman)
 Nebeský NSV-3

Neiva
(Sociedade Constructora Aeronautica Neiva / Indústria Aeronáutica Neiva)
 Neiva BN-1
 Neiva BN-2
 Neiva B Monitor
 Neiva HW-4 Flamingo

Nelson
 Nelson Hummingbird PG-185B
 Nelson BB-1 Dragonfly

Nameche-Wagnon
(Nameche & Wagnon / Association Aéronautique du Nord, Roubaix)
 Nameche-Wagnon 1933 glider

Nessler
(Éric Nessler)
 Nessler N-1 Aérovoilier
 Nessler N-2
 Nessler N-3
 Nessler N-4

Neubauer-Hugel
(Neubauer & Hugel)
 Neubauer-Hugel motorglider

Neukom
(Albert Neukom Segelflugzeugbau / Werner Pfenniger & Albert Markwalder)
 Pfenninger Elfe P1
 Pfenninger Elfe P2
 Pfenninger Elfe PM-1
 Pfenninger-Markwalder Elfe PM-3
 Neukom Elfe M
 Neukom Elfe MN-R
 Neukom Elfe 17
 Neukom S-1 Elfe
 Neukom S-2 Elfe
 Neukom S-3 Standard-Elfe
 Neukom S-4 Elfe 15
 Neukom S-4 Elfe 17
 Neukom AN-66 Super Elfe
 Pfenninger Elfe M

New Jersey Soaring Association
(New Jersey Soaring Association / Pete Bonotaux & Miller)
 New Jersey S.A. Sesquiplane glider

Nida Sklandymo Mokykloje 
(Nida Sklandymo Mokykloje – Nida Gliding School)
 BK-1
 BK-2

Niedrauer
(Jerome Niedrauer)
 Niedrauer NG-1

Niemi
(Leonard A. Niemi / Arlington Aircraft Company)
 Niemi Sisu 1A

Nihon Kogata
 Nihon Kogata Ku-11

Nihon
(Nihon University)
 Nihon N-70 Cygnus

Nijs & Van Driel
(Nijs & Van Driel / J. Akerboom & J. Schmidt)
 Nijs & Van Driel T.10

Nikitin 
(Vasilii Vasilyevich Nikitin)
 Nikitin PSN-1
 Nikitin PSN-2

Nipp
(Ernst Nipp)
 Nipp Bremen-Lane

Nippi
(Nihon Hikoki Kabushiki Kaisha – Japan Aeroplane Manufacturing Co. Ltd.)
 Nippi NP-100A Albatross

Nippon
 Nihon Kogata Ku-11
 Nihon Kogata Ku-14
 Nihon Kogata MXY5

Noble
(Bob Noble)
 Noble 1960 glider

Nogrady
(Claude Bela Nogrady)
 Nogrady Tsarevitch

Noin
(Claude Noin)
 Noin Choucas
 Noin Sirius
 Noin Exel (built by Alpaéro Gap-Tallard)

Nord
(Nord Aviation)
 Nord 1300
 Nord 2000

Nordman
(H. J. Nordman, Flushing, New York)
 Nordman 1923

Norfolk Gliding Club
(Norfolk Gliding Club, Skeyton)
 Norfolk 1936 glider

Northrop
(Northrop Corporation / Jack Northrop)
 Northrop 1928 glider – Jack Northrop
 Northrop MX-324 – rocket powered glider
 Northrop MX-334 – rocket powered glider

Northwestern
(Northwestern Aeronautical Corporation of Minneapolis)
 Northwestern PG-1

Novițchi
(Vladimir Novițchi - designer / CIL-Rehgin - manufacturer)
 Novițchi RG-1
 Novițchi RG-2 Partizan
 Novițchi G-3 Stahanov
 Novițchi RG-4 Pionier
 Novițchi G-5 Pescăruş
 Novițchi RG-9 Albatros

NRC
(National Research Council / Geoffrey Hill)
 NRC tailless glider

NSDFK
(Heinz Kensche / NSDFK Ortsgruppe Berlin / Hochschule für Schauspielkunst Berlin)
 NSDFK Helios aka HFS Berlin Helios

NSFK
(Eichhorn / NSFK Ortsgruppe Bielefeld)
 NSFK Möwe aka Eichhorn Möwe

Nyborg
(T.G.Nyborg)
 Nyborg T.G.N.1

Notes

Further reading

External links

Lists of glider aircraft